Indonesia competed at the 1956 Summer Olympics in Melbourne, Australia. 30 competitors, 28 men and 2 women, took part in 11 events in 6 sports.

Competitors 
The following is the list of number of competitors participating in the Games:

Athletics 

 

 Key
 Note–Ranks given for track events are within the athlete's heat only
 Q = Qualified for the next round
 q = Qualified for the next round as a fastest loser or, in field events, by position without achieving the qualifying target
 NR = National record
 N/A = Round not applicable for the event
 Bye = Athlete not required to compete in round

Fencing 

One fencer represented Indonesia in 1956.

Men's épée
 Siha Sukarno (Round 1, rank 6 Pool 2)

Men's sabre
 Siha Sukarno (Round 1, rank 6 Pool 4)

Football 

Head coach:  Antun Pogačnik

First round

1 Egypt, South Vietnam, and Hungary withdrew. 

Quarterfinals

Shooting 

One shooter represented Indonesia in 1956.

25 m pistol
 Lukman Saketi (30th place)

Swimming

Weightlifting

See also
 1956 Olympic Games
 Indonesia at the Olympics
 Indonesia at the Paralympics

References

External links 
 Official Olympic Reports

Nations at the 1956 Summer Olympics
1956
1956 in Indonesian sport